Jean-François Adam ( 14 October 1980) was a French actor and director.

Career
Adam was an assistant to French filmmakers François Truffaut and Jean-Pierre Melville.

He is known for having played the small role of Colette's lover in the Antoine Doinel saga, and for playing the philosophy teacher in the French drama film Graduate First (1978), directed by Maurice Pialat.

Adam directed the French drama film Return to the Beloved (1979), which stars Isabelle Huppert.

He was also a part-time clown.

Personal life
Adam was married to Brigitte Fossey, and had a daughter, the actress Marie Adam. At the age of 44 Adam shot himself.

See also

 Cinema of France
 List of French actors
 List of French film directors

References

External links
 

1930s births
1980 deaths
20th-century French male actors
Male actors from Paris
French male film actors
French male television actors
Film directors from Paris
Suicides by firearm in France
1980 suicides